Tom Spilman is a programmer, founder, and co-owner at Sickhead Games, a Dallas-based indie game development studio, and a project lead on the MonoGame open source game framework. Spilman has lectured publicly about MonoGame at the 2014 Game Developers Conference and Microsoft Virtual Academy.

References

External links
 Sickhead Games website
 MonoGame website

Mobile game companies
Living people
Year of birth missing (living people)